"Tennessee Border #2" is a country music song written by Jimmy Work, sung by Red Foley and Ernest Tubb, and released on the Decca label. In December 1949, it reached No. 2 on the country best seller and disc jockey charts. It spent 10 weeks on the charts and was the No. 14 juke box country record of 1950.

See also
 Billboard Top Country & Western Records of 1950

References

Red Foley songs
Ernest Tubb songs
1950 songs